The UK Singles Chart is one of many music charts compiled by the Official Charts Company that calculates the best-selling singles of the week in the United Kingdom. Before 2004, the chart was only based on the sales of physical singles. This list shows singles that peaked in the Top 10 of the UK Singles Chart during 1956, as well as singles which peaked in 1955 and 1957 but were in the top 10 in 1956. The entry date is when the single appeared in the top 10 for the first time (week ending, as published by the Official Charts Company, which is six days after the chart is announced).

Eighty-four singles were in the top ten in 1956. Eight singles from 1955 remained in the top 10 for several weeks at the beginning of the year, while  "Make It a Party" by Winifred Atwell, "Singing the Blues" by Guy Mitchell and "True Love" by Bing Crosby & Grace Kelly were all released in 1956 but did not reach their peak until 1957. "Meet Me on the Corner" by Max Bygraves, "Suddenly There's a Valley" by Petula Clark and "Twenty Tiny Fingers" by The Stargazers were the singles from 1955 to reach their peak in 1956. Eighteen artists scored multiple entries in the top 10 in 1956. Elvis Presley, Frankie Vaughan and Lonnie Donegan were among the many artists who achieved their first UK charting top 10 single in 1956.

The 1955 Christmas number-one, "Christmas Alphabet" by Dickie Valentine, remained at number-one for the first week of 1956. The first new number-one single of the year was "Sixteen Tons" by Tennessee Ernie Ford. Overall, eleven different singles peaked at number-one in 1956, with eleven unique artists having the most singles hit that position.

Background

Multiple entries
Eighty-four singles charted in the top 10 in 1956, with seventy-nine singles reaching their peak this year. The EP All Star Hit Parade consisted of six songs by different artists who are all credited for the individual songs but only counts as one entry in the table. Fourteen songs were recorded by several artists with each version reaching the top 10:

"A Tear Fell" - Lita Roza (on All Star Hit Parade), Teresa Brewer
"Blue Suede Shoes" - Carl Perkins, Elvis Presley
"It's Almost Tomorrow" - David Whitfield, The Dream Weavers
"Memories Are Made of This" - Dave King with The Keynotes, Dean Martin
"More" - Jimmy Young, Perry Como
"My September Love" - David Whitfield, Joan Regan (on All Star Hit Parade)
"No Other Love" - Dave King (on All Star Hit Parade), Ronnie Hilton
"Only You" - The Hilltoppers, The Platters
"Sixteen Tons" - Frankie Laine with The Mellomen, Tennessee Ernie Ford
"The Ballad of Davy Crockett" - Bill Hayes, Tennessee Ernie Ford
"The Great Pretender" - Jimmy Parkinson, The Platters
"The Green Door" - Frankie Vaughan, Jim Lowe & The High Fives
"Theme from The Threepenny Opera" - Dick Hyman Trio, Louis Armstrong with His All-Stars, Winifred Atwell
"The Wayward Wind" - Gogi Grant, Tex Ritter

Eighteen artists scored multiple entries in the top 10 in 1956. Bill Haley & His Comets secured the record for most top 10 hits in 1956 with six hit singles.

Ronnie Hilton was one of a number of artists with two top-ten entries, including the number-one single "No Other Love". David Whitfield, Frank Sinatra, Jimmy Young, Perry Como and Tennessee Ernie Ford were among the other artists who had multiple top 10 entries in 1956.

Chart debuts
Thirty-five artists achieved their first top 10 single in 1956, either as a lead or featured artist.  Of these, three went on to record another hit single that year: Dave King, The Goons and The Platters. Lonnie Donegan achieved two more chart hits in 1956. Elvis Presley had three other entries in his breakthrough year.

The following table (collapsed on desktop site) does not include acts who had previously charted as part of a group and secured their first top 10 solo single.

Notes
The EP All Star Hit Parade, which peaked at number two in July, featured the following songs: "Out of Town" by Dickie Valentine; "My September Love" by Joan Regan; "Theme from The Threepenny Opera" by Winifred Atwell; "No Other Love" by Dave King; "A Tear Fell" by Lita Roza and "It's Almost Tomorrow" by David Whitfield. Dave King was the only artist from this set who had not recorded a top 10 single until this year but he appeared in the chart earlier in the year with "Memories Are Made of This", a number five entry in March.

Songs from films
Original songs from various films entered the top 10 throughout the year. These included "Rock-A-Beatin' Boogie", "Only You (And You Alone)" & "The Great Pretender" (The Platters versions), "See You Later, Alligator" and "Giddy Up a Ding Dong" (all from Rock Around the Clock), "(Love Is) The Tender Trap" (The Tender Trap), "[[The Man with the Golden Arm|The Main Title Theme from 'The Man with the Golden Arm]]"(The Man with the Golden Arm), "Moonglow and Theme from Picnic" (Picnic), "Que Sera, Sera (Whatever Will Be, Will Be)" (The Man Who Knew Too Much), "A Woman in Love" (Guys and Dolls), "Rip It Up" (Don't Knock the Rock) and "True Love" (High Society) .

Additionally, several versions of The Ballad of Davy Crockett entered the chart as part of the "Crockett craze", inspired by the 1955 Disney film Davy Crockett, King of the Wild Frontier. Elvis Presley re-recorded his song "Blue Suede Shoes" for the 1960 film he starred in, G.I. Blues. "Hound Dog" was first recorded by Bill Haley & His Comets and featured in Rock Around the Clock, but Elvis Presley took the song into the top ten. Mel Torme's "Mountain Greenery" was a cover of a song that appeared in the 1948 film Words and Music. "My Prayer" by The Platters was originally recorded by Vera Lynn for the 1944 film "One Exciting Night".

Best-selling singles
Until 1970 there was no universally recognised year-end best-sellers list. However in 2011 the Official Charts Company released a list of the best-selling single of each year in chart history from 1952 to date. According to the list, "I'll Be Home" by Pat Boone is officially recorded as the biggest-selling single of 1956. 

Top-ten singles
Key

Entries by artist

The following table shows artists who achieved two or more top 10 entries in 1956, including singles that reached their peak in 1955 or 1957. The figures include both main artists and featured artists. The total number of weeks an artist spent in the top ten in 1956 is also shown.

Notes

 "True Love" reached its peak of number four on 14 February 1957 (week ending).
 "(We're Gonna) Rock Around the Clock" re-entered the top 10 at number 8 on 18 October 1956 (week ending) for 5 weeks.
 "Rock Island Line" re-entered the top 10 at number 9 on 8 March 1956 (week ending) and at number 9 on 22 March 1956 (week ending).
 "See You Later Alligator" re-entered the top 10 at number 10 on 10 May 1956 (week ending).
"The Great Pretender" (Jimmy Parkinson version) re-entered the top 10 at number 9 on 12 April 1956 (week ending) for 2 weeks.
 "Theme from The Threepenny Opera" (Dick Hyman Trio version) re-entered the top 10 at number 9 on 19 April 1956 (week ending) for 2 weeks.
 "The Saints Rock 'N' Roll" re-entered the top 10 at number 10 on 23 August 1956 week ending) and at number 10 on 6 September 1956 (week ending) for 2 weeks.
 "All Star Hit Parade (EP)"'' re-entered the top 10 at number 8 on 16 August 1956 (week ending).
 "Hound Dog" re-entered the top 10 at number 8 on 10 January 1957 (week ending) for 4 weeks and at number 10 on 14 February 1957 (week ending).
 Figure includes single that peaked in 1955.
 Figure includes single that peaked in 1957.
 Figures includes single that appeared on the "All Star Hit Parade" EP.

See also
1956 in British music
List of number-one singles from the 1950s (UK)

References
General

Specific

External links
1956 singles chart archive at the Official Charts Company (click on relevant week)

1956 record charts
1956
1956 in British music